The Bezirk Erfurt was a district (Bezirk) of East Germany. The administrative seat and the main town was Erfurt.

History
The district was established, along with the other 13, on 25 July 1952, substituting the old German states. After 3 October 1990 it was disestablished following German reunification, becoming again part of the state of Thuringia.

Geography

Position
The Bezirk Erfurt bordered the Bezirke of Magdeburg, Halle, Gera and Suhl. It also bordered West Germany.

Subdivision
The Bezirk was divided into 15 Kreise: 2 urban districts (Stadtkreise) and 13 rural districts (Landkreise): 
Urban districts : Erfurt; Weimar.
Rural districts : Apolda; Arnstadt; Eisenach; Erfurt-Land; Gotha; Heiligenstadt; Langensalza; Mühlhausen; Nordhausen; Sömmerda; Sondershausen; Weimar-Land; Worbis.

References

External links

Erfurt
Bezirk Erfurt
Erfurt
Former states and territories of Thuringia